Hospital Ayres de Menezes is the main hospital in the capital city of São Tomé in São Tomé and Príncipe. In 2009, a hemodialysis centre was installed with Portuguese aid. In late June 2017, a new CT scan facility was opened.

See also
List of buildings and structures in  São Tomé and Príncipe

References

External links
Official website

Buildings and structures in São Tomé
Medical and health organisations based in São Tomé and Príncipe
Hospitals in São Tomé and Príncipe